Rajiv Patel is a musician and virtuoso solo-guitarist from Mesa, Arizona.

Story

Patel's Bands
Soon after Before Braille recorded its debut LP, The Rumor, Rajiv Patel was recruited and joined the band as its new lead guitarist. Although he was still only in high school, Patel would seriously influence the style of Before Braille's music  and, according to members of the band, significantly improve it. The significance of his contributions to  Before Braille are most obvious when discovering that some of the music from his solo-releases, such as Make Like a Tree from Of Black Water and Make Like a Tree Part 2 from Get Phased directly inspire the Before Braille song Ticker Tape Charade, which appeared on the Spring Cleaning album.

Patel is also well known for his work as "lead bass player" in the band The Letterpress. Unlike many other bands, The Letterpress lacked any guitars, featuring only two bass players and a drummer. This, however, allowed the band to showcase Patel's skills in quite a different way to make up for the lack of guitarists.

Patel's Solo Work

In addition to his work as a member of various bands, Patel, would also garner significant attention as a solo-guitarist. Because of his unique style, which draws on rock and Middle-Eastern influences, many critics agree that his music might take a couple listens to get used to, yet all appear to enjoy his work, noting that "If you take the time to get into it, you’ll REALLY like this." Ron Trembath at FensePost.com provides another example of the critical acclaim for Patel's solo work, calling it "the fresh cigarette on a Sunday morning or, if you prefer, the black coffee for the unsurpassed rain. This is just plain wonderful."

His live show has been as well received as his recordings, leaving critics "blown away by what an amazing guitarist he is" and finding it "hard to believe someone could make that much music with just one instrument."

Patel's musical hiatus and return

In 2004, Patel took a two-year hiatus from the music industry in order to serve a mission in Peru for the Church of Jesus Christ of Latter-day Saints (LDS Church). After returning from Peru, Patel got back into music. However, because Before Braille broke up while he was still in South America, he would initially pursue other projects. One of them, for example, was a venture with former members of Before Braille and Jared Woosley of Fivespeed called Red Means Red, although it does not appear that this band ever really got off the ground. Then in 2009, Patel released his first solo recording in five years, the Get Phased EP, and toured with Dear and the Headlights as both an opening act, as well as its bass player.

Discography

Solo albums

Albums with Bands

Solo Contributions to Compilations
 Americopa Mantle, Vol. 1 (Sunset Alliance, 2003)
Song: Rock 'N Roll Friends Check Each Others' Books Back In

References

External links
 Rajiv Patel MySpace (Inactive since 2010)
 Sunset Alliance Records
 Before Braille

American rock guitarists
American male guitarists
American indie rock musicians
Living people
Year of birth missing (living people)